Jaime Ricaurte Hurtado González (7 February 1937 – 17 February 1999) was an Ecuadorian politician of African descent aligned with the Democratic People's Movement (MPD), a deputy in the Ecuadorian parliament, and at the time of his death was standing for election to the Ecuadorian presidency.

Biography

Childhood 
Born in the abandoned parish of Malimpia in Quinindé, a canton of Esmeraldas, one of the many forgotten areas of the country. It was a February 7, 1937, his parents were Esteban Hurtado and Pastora Gonzalez, who were illiterate.

His life was made in the country. There he lived and worked his first years. In the midst of the agricultural labors he performed with his parents and siblings, he wove his dreams and hopes. It was also dedicated to the cultivation of banana, cane and coconut. At the age of 10, he began his studies in the city of Esmeraldas at the "21 de Septiembre" School after having dedicated himself to helping his parents. although at school he continued to do so, dedicating himself thus when he finished the school day to clean the shoes and later to help his parents in the small bar that they administered until dawn.

Sports Activity 
He studied high school in the "5 de Agosto" College of the province´s capital, an institution that granted him a scholarship to finish his studies at the "Eloy Alfaro" School, in the city of Guayaquil , where he developed an intense sports activity in basketball and athletics .

He was selected from basketball by the province of Esmeraldas, in the College "Eloy Alfaro". He developed his physical qualities with great success in the athletic activity. Represented to the Province of Guayas by several occasions. He won the gold medal in triple jump, javelin and discus throw, 110 meters hurdles and 1,500 meters flat. As a basketball player,he joined the Atlétic and Emelec clubs.

University life 
His higher studies were carried out at the University of Guayaquil, where he started and actively participated in politics. He was president of the Association School of Law , and candidate for the Presidency of the Federation of University Students of Ecuador, FEUE.

Political life 
In 1966 , he entered the Marxist-Leninist Communist Party of Ecuador (MLCPE), arriving at the Central Committee and the Political Bureau of MLCPE. participated in the founding of the MPD in 1978 , being first candidate to vice-president in a binomial to which he was not allowed to participate in the elections of 1978 , to the TSE not to recognize the legal personage of the MPD, soon after obtaining the MPD its recognition would be elected in 1979 national deputy after the return to the democracy.

In 1984 participates like candidate for the Presidency of the Republic , in binomial with Alfonso Yánez. Then between 1990 and 1994 , National Director of MPD. In 1998 he returned to the National Congress, his parliamentary activity was characterized by his denunciations of acts of corruption and the defense of the interests of the working class.

Assassination 
Sources loyal to the MPD state that Hurtado, his nephew, and his bodyguard were shot to death at 13:20 local time in a public place a short distance away from well-guarded government buildings. The assassins got away unhindered in a car. Allegations have been made that implicate then-president Jamil Mahuad in the event.

Recent developments
One of the suspected assassins, Christian Steven Ponce, had fled Ecuador shortly after being arrested, and was caught in upstate New York on February 2007 when he was driving a car while not wearing a seat belt.

References

1937 births
1999 deaths
Assassinated Ecuadorian politicians
Deaths by firearm in Ecuador
People murdered in Ecuador
Members of the National Congress (Ecuador)
Democratic People's Movement politicians
People from Esmeraldas Province
1999 murders in Ecuador
Hoxhaists
Anti-revisionists